Lambda Lambda Lambda ( or Tri-Lambs) is a national collegiate co-ed social fraternity founded on January 15, 2006 at the University of Connecticut in Storrs, Connecticut by a small group of students. On April 8, 2017, the Alpha chapter inducted their Upsilon Class, bringing their historical numbering to 157.

History

Founding
Inspired by the movies Revenge of the Nerds and National Lampoon's Animal House, Lambda Lambda Lambda is a small co-ed social fraternity, unaffiliated with the Interfraternity and Panhellenic Councils, dedicated to the enjoyment and enrichment of pop culture and to the camaraderie of its members. Tri-Lambs does not discriminate based on race, gender, religion, class, gender identity, or sexual orientation. The fraternity was founded on the grounds of changing what a fraternity is back to its original meaning. The "openness of the fraternity" leads it to be a place in which to create a "network of support" among its brothers and sisters.

History of inclusivity
Per the founding ideals of the fraternity, Lambda Lambda Lambda has historically included a range of students in its ranks.  While each sister or brother is specially chosen to join the fraternity, the opportunity to rush is afforded to all students in a chapter's jurisdiction and selection is made based on that individual's merits.  Similarly, the chapters of Lambda Lambda Lambda represent a wide range of takes on the national organization's guiding principles while upholding the original standard of merit.  As such, groups interested in instating new chapters must contact Alpha chapter before taking any steps to do so in order to be recognized by the fraternity and be assured of following the mission of the organization.

Government
The fraternity is governed by the University of Connecticut's Alpha chapter.  A group of officers presides over all matters both internally and externally with changes to the running of the organization being decided by majority vote at chapter meetings achieving a quorum of active sisters or brothers.  The Alpha chapter is also responsible for colonization and induction of new chapters. Historically, a representative of Alpha chapter has guided the first class of new chapters into the fraternity before that chapter embarks on the task of self-governance. Groups interested in instating new chapters must contact Alpha chapter before taking any steps to do so in order to appropriately establish a new chapter according to the organization's standards.

Membership requirements
Sisters and brothers of Lambda Lambda Lambda must be inducted by a chapter accredited by the National Fraternity.  Individual chapters may stipulate requirements for eligibility within the precepts of the mission of the organization.  Typically, a group of students is selected from the pool of interested and eligible candidates by active members of the chapter.  Following this selection these individuals learn about the organization prior to their formal induction into the fraternity.

Chapters

Chapter history
The Alpha chapter was founded as a student group at the University of Connecticut and has become more and more recognized by both students and the administration at that university.  The induction of the Beta chapter at SUNY Buffalo in fall 2008 as well as the combined induction of three new chapters at University of Maryland, Baltimore County, Western Washington University (pending recognition from university), and Bowie State University on January 14, 2012 has served to show that there is a demand for non-IFC and non-Panhel fraternity organizations.  Chapters that fail to induct new members became inactive, as occurred to State University of New York at Buffalo's Beta chapter.

Rogue chapters
A number of rogue chapters have inducted themselves at a variety of institutions. The rogue chapter at Sacred Heart University has claimed the title of "Zeta chapter". Tennessee Technological University hosts a chapter that has claimed "Pi chapter".  These chapters and other rogue chapters are not sanctioned by Lambda Lambda Lambda National Fraternity. New chapters of Tri-Lambs become created through a process delineated by the National Fraternity and administered by Alpha chapter. Groups interested in instating new chapters must contact Alpha chapter before taking any steps to do so.

List of chapters
This is the list of chapters of Lambda Lambda Lambda. Groups interested in installing new chapters must contact Alpha chapter before taking any steps to do so.  The above list represents all five vetted chapters of the fraternity. At present, Lambda Lambda Lambda is not accepting new chapters. Active chapters are indicated in bold, inactive chapters indicated by italics.

References

External links
 University of Connecticut Lambda Lambda Lambda page
 DailyCampus.com: Friends Start Fraternity from Scratch
 AS Review: 
 The Western Front:   

University of Connecticut
Fraternities and sororities in the United States
Student organizations established in 2006
Revenge of the Nerds
2006 establishments in Connecticut